The Audi Quattro is a road and rally car, produced by the German automobile manufacturer Audi, part of the Volkswagen Group. It was first shown at the 1980 Geneva Motor Show on 3 March. Production continued through 1991.

Background

The word quattro is derived from the Italian word for "four" to represent the fact that the vehicle delivers power to all four wheels. The name has also been used by Audi to refer to the quattro four-wheel-drive system, or any four-wheel-drive version of an Audi model. The original Quattro model is also commonly referred to as the Ur-Quattro - the "Ur-" (German for "primordial", "original", or "first of its kind") is an augmentative prefix. The idea of such a car came from the Audi engineer Jörg Bensinger.

The Audi Quattro was the first rally car to take advantage of the then-recently changed rules that allowed the use of four-wheel drive in competition racing. It won consecutive competitions for the next two years. To commemorate the success of the original vehicle, all subsequent Audi production automobiles with this four-wheel-drive system were badged with the trademark quattro with a lower case "q" letter.

The Audi Quattro shared many parts and platform with the Coupé version of the Audi 80 (B2). The quattro was internally designated Typ 85, a production code it shared with the quattro versions of the Audi Coupé. Its characteristic flared wheelarches were styled by Martin Smith. The Audi Quattro also had independent front and rear suspension.

Production history
The idea for a high-performance four-wheel-drive car was proposed in 1977 by Audi's chassis engineer, Jörg Bensinger, after he found that the Volkswagen Iltis military vehicle could outperform other vehicles when tested in the snow. An Audi 80 variant was developed in co-operation with Walter Treser, Director of Pre-Development.

European market
Audi introduced the original Quattro to European customers in late 1980, featuring Audi's quattro permanent four-wheel drive system, and the first to mate the front-engine, four-wheel-drive layout with a turbocharged engine.

The engine was eventually modified to a  inline-5 with 10 valves, still generating , but with peak torque lower in the rev-range.

The Quattro was partially hand-built on a dedicated line. Production totaled 11,452 units from 1980 to 1991, and through this 11 year production there were no major changes in the visual design of the car. For the 1983 model year, the dashboard did away with an analogue instrument cluster now fitted with a green digital liquid crystal display (LCD) electronic instrument cluster. This was later changed in 1988 to an orange LCD electronic instrument cluster. The interior was redesigned in 1984, and featured a new dashboard layout, new steering wheel design, and new centre console design, the switches around the instrument panel were also redesigned. In 1985, the dashboard changed slightly with harder foam and it lost a diagonal stripe, the switches were varied slightly and the diff lock pull knob gave way to a two-position turn knob with volt and oil temp digital readouts.

Exterior styling received little modification during the Quattro's production run. Originally, the car had a flat front grille featuring four separate headlamp lenses, one for each of the low and high beam units. This was altered for the 1983 model year with combined units featuring a single lens housing twin reflectors. This was changed again, for the 1985 model year, in what has become known as the 'facelift model' and included such alterations as a new sloping front grille, headlights, and trim and badging changes. The 20V RR Quattro also featured a new three-spoke steering wheel design, leather trim for door arm rests, gloveboxes, centre console and door pockets. There was also a full length leather-wrapped centre console running all the way to the rear seats and 'quattro' script on the interior with partial leather seats. The floor on the driver's side had a bulge due to dual catalytic exhaust setup. The different models may be distinguished by the emblems on their boot lids: the WR had a vinyl 'quattro' decal or a brushed aluminium effect plastic emblem, the MB had chrome plated 'Audi', 'Audi rings' and 'quattro' emblems, whilst the RR had only chrome plated 'Audi rings'.

The rear suspension was altered early on with geometry changes and removal of the rear anti-roll bar to reduce a tendency for lift-off oversteer. For the 1984 facelift, the wheel size went from 6x15-inch with 205/60-15 tyres to 8x15-inch wheels with 215/50-15 Pirelli Cinturato P5 tyres. At the same time the suspension was lowered by 20 mm with slightly stiffer springs for improved handling. For 1987, the Torsen centre differential was used for the first time, replacing the manual centre differential lock.

The last original Audi Quattro was produced on 17 May 1991, more than two years after the first models of the new Audi Coupé (8B) range (based on the 1986 Audi 80) had been introduced.

North American market
Sales of the Quattro in North America began in the 1983 model year. They entered the all-wheel-drive market established by the AMC Eagle, the first full-time automatic all-wheel-drive line of passenger cars to reach mass production. The small Subaru Leone station wagon offered an optional part-time 4-wheel drive system in the US market starting in 1975.

The North American Quattro was manufactured concurrently and were of the same design as their European 1982 model year counterparts (they did not include the minor cosmetic changes of the 1983 European model) and continued through 1986. Total sales in the U.S. totalled 664 units. The Canadian market cars were identical to the U.S. version with exception of the speedometer, which was metric. Official sales figures for Canada were 99 units, which included 61 sold in 1983, 17 sold in 1984, 18 sold in 1985, and 3 sold in 1986.

The U.S./Canadian cars were equipped with larger impact bumpers with built-in shock absorbers, like the rest of the 4000/Coupé models. They did not have anti-lock braking system (ABS), but included air conditioning and leather upholstery. Most of the 1984 and 1985 Canadian models came without sunroofs. The remainder of the electric, suspension, and cosmetic updates took place at the same time as the European cars.

Other mechanical specifications were identical to the European market vehicles. The WX engine was also utilized in Swiss and Japanese market cars. Audi built 200 special edition cars in 1988 with the WX engine and analogue instrument cluster, with everything else identical to the MB model of that year.

Press reviews

In May 1981, Autocar magazine road tested a left hand drive Quattro (registration number WBD 335W), one of the first magazines to do so since it was introduced. Beginning with a photograph in the magazine of a Quattro cornering hard on Pendine beach in South-west Wales, Autocar's Road Test Editor raved about the Quattro's "thrilling performance" being impressed with its traction and acceleration particularly on wet, greasy and slippery surfaces, noting that only the Porsche 911 could match its traction and acceleration in slippery conditions. After extensive driving across the mountain roads of Wales, the Road Test editor mentioned that while the 60/40 front/rear weight distribution can make the Quattro "tricky in extremis" under very hard cornering, the editor wrote that "When Driven with respect, once you have learned its ways, the Quattro is nevertheless magnificent, particularly through a wet and deserted roundabout or series of open bends." The road test editor praised the interior's "comfortable refinement" and judged that its 1981 £14,500 price tag "is very good value for money considering its performance and the fact that its BMW, Porsche and Jaguar rivals cost £5000 more." (In summer 1981 both a Jaguar XJS V12 and BMW 6 Series Coupe on sale in the UK cost almost £20,000). Adding the caveat that in 1981 (and until summer 1983) the Quattro was only available in left hand drive in the UK, the Autocar Road Test concluded that the Quattro "is a vastly satisfying and enjoyable car to drive."

Audi quattro Spyder concept (1991)
The Audi quattro Spyder was a mid-engine coupé equipped with a 2.8-litre V6 engine taken from the Audi 100. The car was a rolling test bed for a future mid-engine sports car and featured a 5-speed manual gearbox, a modified version for the quattro four-wheel-drive system, aluminium body panels with a tubular steel space frame,  kerb weight and a suspension system with trapezoidal links. All of the unique features depicted in the concept car would find their way in future Audi production vehicles.

The car was production-ready and garnered a lot of acclaim from both the motoring press and prospective buyers but due to the economic downturn of the 1990s, Audi decided not to press ahead with the project as the demand would not outweigh the development costs for the model.

The concept car was unveiled at the 1991 Frankfurt Motor Show.

Audi quattro concept (2010)

At the Paris Motor Show in 2010, Audi presented the quattro concept on the occasion of the 30th anniversary of the original Audi Quattro and the Audi quattro four-wheel-drive system. Based on the RS5, it features a modified 2.5 L five-cylinder TFSI engine shared with the TT and a 6-speed manual transmission from the S4. The revolutionary design features depicted on the concept car would eventually make their way on future Audi models.

Weight saving was kept in consideration even throughout the interior and the seats also weighed  each besides having adjustment motors. The dashboard featured an LCD console displaying vital information about the car and buttons arranged in a vertical way on the binnacle harked back to the original Audi Quattro.

The Quattro four-wheel-drive system used in the concept was a rear-biased design utilising a two-stage differential distributing power front and aft through planetary gears.

The concept utilised carbon-ceramic braking system for improved stopping power. The car had a claimed  acceleration time of 3.8 seconds.

It was reported that Audi was considering a limited production model (200–500 cars) based on the quattro concept. However, the idea of production was scrapped in favour of expanding the company's crossover range.

Audi Sport quattro concept (2013)

The Audi Sport quattro concept was unveiled at the 2013 Frankfurt Motor Show (IAA) to commemorate the 30th anniversary of the original Audi Sport quattro. The show car features angular flat C-pillars, as well as rectangular double headlights featuring Audi's Matrix LED technology, a spoiler at the lower edge of the rear window, rectangular tail lights, 21-inch wheels, carbon fibre-ceramic brake discs, bucket seats with integrated head restraints, multifunction sport steering wheel, two driving modes (race and setup) in virtual 3D displays, Audi MMI control unit, and air conditioning. The doors and fenders were made of aluminum, while the roof, hood, and the rear hatch were made of carbon fiber-reinforced polymer. The front suspension features five control arms per wheel while the rear has track-controlled trapezoidal link.

At the 2014 Geneva Motor Show, Audi presented the new 2014 Audi TT Quattro Sport Concept. The concept featured Audi's Quattro AWD system and an S Tronic dual-clutch transmission.

Motorsport

Quattro - A1 and A2 evolutions

The original Audi Quattro competition car debuted in 1980, first as a development car, and then on a formal basis in the 1980 Jänner Rallye in Austria. In 1981, Michèle Mouton became the first female driver to win a world championship rally, piloting an Audi Quattro.

The Quattro A1 debuted at the WRC 1983 season opener Monte Carlo Rally, and went on to win the Swedish Rally and the Rally Portugal in the hands of Hannu Mikkola. Driven by Stig Blomqvist, Mikkola and Walter Röhrl, the A2 evolution won a total of eight world rallies, three in 1983 and five in 1984. Two examples of the same car completely dominated the South African National Rally Championships during 1984 to 1988, with S.A. champion drivers Sarel van der Merwe and Geoff Mortimer.

In 1988, the Audi Ur-Quattro driven by Audi Tradition driver Luciano Viaro won the 13th Silvretta Classic Montafon.

Sport Quattro

The Audi Sport Quattro S1 was a variant of the Quattro developed for homologation for Group B rallying in 1984, and sold as a production car in limited numbers. It featured an all aluminium  Inline-five engine with a bore x stroke of  DOHC 4 valves per cylinder, Bosch LH Jetronic fuel injection and a KKK K27 turbocharger. The engine was slightly smaller than that of the standard Audi Quattro in terms of displacement in order to qualify for the 3-litre engine class after the 1.4 multiplication factor applied to turbocharged engines.

The car in competition form also featured a body shell composed of carbon-kevlar and wider wheel arches, wider wheels (nine inches as compared to the Ur-Quattro's optional  wheels), the steeper windscreen rake of the Audi 80 (requested by the Audi Sport rally team drivers to reduce internal reflections from the dashboard for improved visibility) and, most noticeably, a  shorter wheelbase.

In addition to Group B competition in rallying, the Sport Quattro won the 1985 Pikes Peak International Hill Climb with Michèle Mouton in the driving seat, setting a record time in the process. 224 cars in total of this "short version" Sport Quattro were built, and were offered for sale for DM 203,850.

Sport Quattro S1 E2

The Audi Sport Quattro S1 E2 was introduced at the end of 1985 as an update to the Audi Sport Quattro S1. However, the turbocharger utilised a recirculating air system, with the aim of keeping the unit spinning at high rpm, when the driver closed the throttle, either to back off during cornering, or on gearshifts. This allowed the engine to resume full power immediately after the resumption of full throttle, reducing turbo lag.

In addition to the improved power output, an aggressive aerodynamic kit was added that featured very distinctive wings and spoilers at the front and rear of the car to increase downforce. The S1 could accelerate from 0- in 3.1 seconds. Some of the cars were supplied with a "power-shift gearbox", a forerunner of the DSG technology.

The S1 E2 made its debut at the 1985 Rally Argentina, with Blomqvist driving. This variant was successful in the rally circuit, with Röhrl and Christian Geistdörfer winning the 1985 San Remo Rally. A modified version of the E2, was also driven by Michèle Mouton. The S1 E2 would become the final Group B car produced by Audi, with the works team withdrawing from the Championship following the 1986 rally in Portugal. In 1987, the car won the Pikes Peak International Hill Climb driven by Walter Röhrl.

Sport Quattro RS 002 

Audi Sport Quattro RS 002 - Sports prototype "Group S" was a rally car that was initially designed for the forthcoming Group S regulations for 1987. The car was tested by Walter Röhrl but it never raced; the Group S regulations were scrapped along with the Group B regulations after a number of accidents involving fatalities during the 1986 season.

The car has a longitudinal mid-engine layout and a four-wheel drive system. The car is displayed in the museum "Audi museum mobile" in Ingolstadt.

Specifications:
Kerb weight: 

Engine:  I5

Power: 

Top speed: 

Dimensions: Length 4,500 mm, Width 1,900 mm, Height 1,020 mm.

WRC results

Summary

WRC victories

In popular culture

A red 1983 Quattro was driven by DCI Gene Hunt (played by Philip Glenister) in the television drama Ashes to Ashes (aired on BBC1 from 2008 to 2010). Two cars were used through the run of the series: the original, and a stunt car that was acquired for series 2. Both portrayed the same car. The original vehicle (also used in the Children in Need Top Gear crossover mini-episode) lacked a sunroof which was present on the car(s) used in series 2 and 3, hence a fake one was added for the sake of continuity.
The stunt car was written off for the jump in series 3, episode 1 by the director of that episode and used as a parts and interior shots car until it was shot up in the finale, leaving the original car intact

In the run-up to the 2010 general election, a campaign poster by the incumbent Labour Party government portrayed Conservative Party and opposition leader David Cameron as Gene Hunt sitting on the bonnet of the iconic red Audi Quattro and urged voters not to allow Cameron to take Britain "back to the 1980s" by electing his party into government amid fears that it would lead to a repeat of the social unrest and unemployment that Margaret Thatcher's Conservative government of that era oversaw. The image was then adopted by the Conservatives, with the slogan "Fire up the Quattro, it's time for change", with the comment 'Idea kindly donated by the Labour Party'. "Fire up the Quattro" was a call to action uttered by DCI Hunt in Ashes to Ashes.

See also
 AMC Eagle, the first mass-produced all-wheel-drive car introduced in August 1979
 Audi S and RS models
 Jensen FF, the first all-wheel-drive road car, introduced in 1966

References

Notes

Bibliography

External links

 Evolution of the models Audi quattro, 1980-1991: English,German
Audi Quattro Sport S1

Quattro
Coupés
Rally cars
Sport Quattro
All-wheel-drive vehicles
Group B cars
Cars introduced in 1980
1990s cars
Group 4 (racing) cars
Sports cars
World Rally championship-winning cars
Cars discontinued in 1991